Sebastian Stålberg (born March 6, 1990) is a Swedish professional ice hockey Forward. He is currently playing with Frölunda HC of the Swedish Hockey League (SHL).

Stålberg made his Swedish Hockey League debut playing with Frölunda HC during the 2014–15 SHL season. He is the younger brother to Viktor who plays in the National Hockey League (NHL) with the Ottawa Senators.

Awards and honors

References

External links

1990 births
Living people
Frölunda HC players
Ontario Reign (ECHL) players
Portland Pirates players
Rögle BK players
San Francisco Bulls players
Swedish ice hockey forwards
Vermont Catamounts men's ice hockey players
Worcester Sharks players
People from Lerum Municipality
Sportspeople from Västra Götaland County